The spectrUM Discovery Area is a free and public science museum, located in the Missoula Public Library at 455 East Main Street in Missoula, Montana. spectrUM Discovery Area offers summer camps, birthday parties, no-school camps, and after school clubs. Each year, spectrUM reaches 200,000 people with fun, hands-on exhibits and activities at the Missoula museum and through award-winning programs beyond our museum walls.

Founded in 2007 by medicinal chemist Dr. Charles Thompson, spectrUM is dedicated to teaching science through hands-on exhibits and activities. As part of the Broader Impacts Group at the University of Montana, spectrUM connects Montana's next generation to opportunities in STEM and higher education. spectrUM provides robust science educational programming in the Missoula-based museum, now located at the new award-winning Missoula Public Library, as well as programming beyond our museum walls and in collaboration with many community partners.

spectrUM's national sponsors and partners include the National Science Foundation EPSCoR Program, the Institute of Museum and Library Services, the NISE Network, and SciGirls. In Montana, we are supported by the O.P. and W.E. Edwards Foundation, the Jane S. Heman Foundation, and the tireless individuals and businesses who support STEM and education in our communities.

References

External links
spectrUM website

Science museums in Montana
Buildings and facilities of the University of Montana
2007 establishments in Montana
Museums in Missoula, Montana
University museums in Montana
University and college buildings completed in 2007